The Mississauga Twins were an independent, minor league baseball team of the semi-pro, Intercounty Baseball League based in Mississauga, Ontario. They played their home games at Meadowvale Field.  They moved to Burlington, Ontario, in 2011 and became the Burlington Twins.

Baseball teams in Ontario
Intercounty Baseball League
Sport in Mississauga
Baseball teams established in 2009
Baseball teams in Toronto
Baseball teams disestablished in 2011
2009 establishments in Ontario
2011 disestablishments in Ontario